Lahar can refer to
 Lahar, a kind of volcanic mudflow
 Lahar (god), a Sumerian god
 Lahar, India, a town in  Madhya Pradesh, India